William George Marten (5 September 1845 – 25 November 1907) was an English professional cricketer who played in 45 first-class cricket matches between 1865 and 1872.

Marten was born at Tunbridge Wells in Kent in 1845. He made his first-class debut for Kent County Cricket Club in 1865 before going on to play 15 times for the county between then and 1871. In 1871 he joined Surrey, playing 24 times for the team until 1872. Marten was a professional bowler on the MCC ground staff at Lord's. He played for MCC sides between 1867 ad 1871, including making three first-class appearances for the club, and played non-first-class cricket for a wide variety of teams, including for Essex sides before the county had first-class status.

One of Marten's matches for Surrey in 1872 saw the match completed in one day after the opponents, MCC, were bowled out for 16 runs in their first innings. Marten took six wickets for 11 runs in the MCC first innings, his career best bowling figures, but failed to take a wicket in his 21 four-ball overs in the second innings.

Marten stood as an umpire in one first-class match in 1882. He died at Stoke Newington in London in November 1907 aged 62.

References

External links

1845 births
1907 deaths
English cricketers
Kent cricketers
Surrey cricketers
Marylebone Cricket Club cricketers
Players of the South cricketers
Professionals of Marylebone Cricket Club cricketers